Robert Murray Haig (1887 – 1953) was an American economist regarded as an expert in public finance and taxation. The concept of Haig–Simons income bears his name.

Haig graduated with a PhD in economics from Columbia University in 1914, with a thesis written under supervision of Edwin Robert Anderson Seligman.

References 

1887 births
1953 deaths
20th-century American economists
Columbia Graduate School of Arts and Sciences alumni
Columbia University faculty
Georgist economists